Preservation of the Rights of Prisoners (PROP) was a prisoners' rights organisation set up in the early 1970s in the United Kingdom, which organised more than one hundred prison demonstrations, strikes and protests.

Formation
In the first five months of 1972 there were across the United Kingdom over fifty peaceful protests by prisoners.
PROP was launched on 11 May 1972 in a public house named the Prince Arthur opposite Pentonville Prison, formed to "preserve, protect and to extend the rights of prisoners and ex-prisoners and to assist in their rehabilitation and re-integration into society, so as to bring about a reduction in crime."

PROP's foundation meeting was held in Hull and was attended by 60 people. Speakers included Norwegian sociologist Thomas Mathiesen, Jack Ashwell local branch secretary of the TGWU and Ros Kane from Radical Alternatives to Prison. The sociologist Mike Fitzgerald took on the role of Press Officer.

Prison Strike

Later, on 4 August 1972, PROP organise a 24-hour general strike involving 10,000 prisoners in 33 prisons in favour of the demands in the PROP charter.
The prisons involved included:

HM Prison Albany
HM Prison Birmingham
HM Prison Blundeston
HM Prison Bristol
HM Prison Brixton
HM Prison Camp Hill
HM Prison Canterbury
HM Prison Chelmsford
HM Prison Coldingley
HM Prison Dartmoor
HM Prison Durham

HM Prison Gartree
HM Prison Gloucester
HM Prison Haverigg
HM Prison Hull
HM Prison Lancaster
HM Prison Leeds
HM Prison Leicester
HM Prison Lincoln
HM Prison Liverpool
HM Prison Long Lartin
HM Prison Maidstone

HM Prison Manchester
HM Prison Northeye
HM Prison Nottingham
HM Prison Oxford
HM Prison Parkhurst
HM Prison Pentonville
HM Prison Preston
HM Prison Stafford
HM Prison Wakefield
HM Prison Wandsworth
HM Prison Wormwood Scrubs

References

Prison-related organizations
Organizations established in 1972
Human rights organisations based in the United Kingdom